Caymanabyssiidae is a family of sea snails, marine gastropod mollusks in the vaude Vetigastropoda (according to the taxonomy of the Gastropoda by Bouchet & Rocroi, 2005).

This family has no subfamilies. This family was originally the subfamily Caymanabyssiinae  Marshall 1985, in the family Pseudococculinidae, containing the  genera  Caymanabyssia  and Colotrachelus. The three other genena were added later by Haszprunar (1988)

Description
The microsculpture of the protoconch consists of prismatic crystals. The apical folds are fused. The rachidian and the lateral teeth of the radula lack cutting surfaces. They have one or several gill leaflets  on the left side of the soft body.

Genera 
 Amphiplica Haszprunar, 1988
 Caymanabyssia Moskalev, 1976
 Colotrachelus Marshall, 1986
 Yaquinabyssia Haszprunar, 1988

References